Fang Qiniang ( Fāng Qīniáng) was a Chinese martial artist and founder of the Fujian White Crane style of Chinese martial arts in the mid-17th century. She learned martial arts from her father, Fang Zhengdong, a lay Shaolin disciple.

Legend
According to the legend, Fang Qiniang was born in Lishui, Zhejiang, China, during the Ming dynasty. Her father was Fang Zhengdong and her mother Lee Pikliung. Her father trained Shaolin luohan quan at the 9 Lot Mountain Temple in the Ching Chiang district in Fujian Province; this temple was one of the Shaolin enclaves of Fujian and the Ming revolutionaries. During that time, the Qianlong Emperor ordered the destruction of Southern Shaolin Temple and the death of all Ming revolutionaries. Fang Zhengdong was one of the lucky few to escape alive. He initially fled with his family to Pik Chui Liang to finally settle near the Ching Chu temple on the Ching Chea mountain in Yongchun village.

Her father died during a fight with a neighbor and she vowed to avenge him. One day, while she was trying to improve her fighting skills, she saw two cranes fighting. She observed them and tried to scare them off with a stick. She wasn't able to and meditating on it later, she decided that she had to learn from the cranes, and developed her own unique techniques from the experience. After three years of training she became a skilled and unusual fighter and started to gain disciples and challengers. One of her challengers was Zeng Cinshu.

References 

Female duellists
Martial arts school founders
Chinese female martial artists
People from Lishui
Ming dynasty people
17th-century martial artists